The Tanimbar boobook, or Tanimbar hawk-owl (Ninox forbesi), is a species of owl in the family Strigidae. It is found in the Tanimbar Islands of Indonesia. Its natural habitat is subtropical or tropical moist lowland forests. It is threatened by habitat loss. It used to be considered a subspecies of the Moluccan boobook.

References

Norman, J.A., L. Christidis, M. Westerman, and F.A. Richard-Hall. 1998. Molecular data confirm the species status of the Christmas Island Hawk-Owl Ninox natalis. Emu 98: 197–208.
Rheindt, F.E., and R.O. Hutchinson. 2007. A photoshot odyssey through the confused avian taxonomy of Seram and Buru (southern Moluccas). BirdingASIA 7: 18–38.

Ninox
Birds described in 1883
Birds of Indonesia
Taxa named by Philip Sclater